Éamonn Burns (1963 – 9 October 2019) was an Irish Gaelic footballer and manager. He played for Down Senior Championship club Bryansford and was a member of the Down senior football team for over a decade, during which time he usually lined out at midfield.

Honours

Down
All-Ireland Senior Football Championship (2): 1991, 1994
Ulster Senior Football Championship (2): 1991, 1994

References

1963 births
2019 deaths
Down inter-county Gaelic footballers
Gaelic football managers